The Transport Legislation Amendment (Taxi Services Reform and Other Matters) Act 2011 (the Act) is a law enacted by the Parliament of the State of Victoria, Australia to reform taxi and other small commercial passenger vehicle services in the State.

The Act amended the Transport Integration Act 2010 and the Transport (Compliance and Miscellaneous) Act 1983 to give force to the Taxi Industry Inquiry and to make other changes in the taxi and small commercial passenger vehicle services.

The Act was passed in late June 2011 and partially commenced by proclamation on 19 July 2011. The initial commencement operated to establish and empower the Taxi Services Commission and to give legislative force to the Taxi Industry Inquiry being conducted by the Commission. Provisions in the Act transferring regulatory responsibility to the Commission are yet to be activated.

The responsible Minister for the Act is the Minister for Public Transport, Terry Mulder.

Outline 
The stated purpose of the Act is "...to provide for the reform of the commercial passenger vehicle industry...".  In general, the Act establishes a regulatory scheme with the following key elements -
 establishment of a Taxi Services Commission
 a mandate that the Commission will conduct an inquiry (the Taxi Industry Inquiry) into the taxi and small commercial passenger industries in Victoria
 transfer of responsibility for the regulation of the taxi and small commercial passenger industries from the Director of Public Transport to the Secretary of the Department of Transport
 provision following the completion of the inquiry for the transfer of responsibility for the regulation of taxis and other small commercial passenger vehicles from the Secretary to the Taxi Services Commission.

Context 
The Victorian Government's pursuit of the Act was driven by concerns about the ongoing poor performance of Victoria's taxi industry and the desire to establish an inquiry and signal long term organisational and regulatory changes.

Announcement 

An inquiry into the taxi industry was announced on 28 March 2011 by the Premier of Victoria, Ted Baillieu. The premier advised that the inquiry would be headed by Professor Allan Fels, the former head of the Australian Competition & Consumer Commission. Baillieu said the Fels Inquiry’s key tasks would include improving disastrously low levels of public confidence, providing better security and support services for drivers and safety for customers, and ensuring drivers were properly trained and knowledgeable.

The media release issued by the Premier announcing the Inquiry reported him as saying that -

"The state of the taxi industry has deteriorated under the former Labor Government, failing both passengers and the industry.  It is a troubled industry that needs significant reform to drive improvements in service."

Taxi industry problems 
The key problems with the current Victorian taxi industry listed by Baillieu in his announcement were -
    
 low customer satisfaction, with a sharp decline over the past five to six years
 safety and security for passengers and drivers
 insufficient support for drivers
 too many poorly-skilled drivers with inadequate knowledge
 a high turnover of drivers resulting in a shortage of experienced drivers
 complex ownership and management structures
 lack of competition
 too much of the industry revenue not being directed to the service providers – the drivers and operators.

Inquiry details and ongoing regulatory responsibilities 
Reforming the Victorian taxi industry occurred in two stages.  Firstly, the Fels Inquiry undertook a comprehensive inquiry into the service, safety and competition issues in the Victorian taxi industry.  Secondly, following Professor Fels’ investigation, the Taxi Services Commission took over industry regulation with the powers and tools necessary to drive reform in the taxi industry.

The previous taxi industry regulator, the Victorian Taxi Directorate (VTD), continued to operate as normal until the Commission was established.  During the second stage staff and resources from the VTD were moved to TSC once it assumes the ongoing role of regulator.

Parts 
The Transport Legislation Amendment (Taxi Services Reform and Other Matters) Act 2011 is divided into four parts -  
 Preliminary
 Initial Amendments
 Post Inquiry Amendments
 Repeal of Amending Act

The substantive parts of the Act are Parts 2 and 3, while the remaining parts are predominantly formal. The Part 2 amendments are now in force. The Part 3 amendments are yet to commence.

Initial Amendments

Establishment of the Taxi Services Commission

Inquiry phase 
The Act establishes a new Taxi Services Commission as a body corporate.  In its initial incarnation, the Commission is responsible for conducting an inquiry into the taxi industry and the wider small commercial passenger vehicle industry.  The Commission is then required to report on those matters including by making recommendations about how the commercial passenger vehicle industry should be structured and regulated.

The initial changes have broad scope.  They enable the Commission to not only investigate traditional matters relating to vehicles, drivers, licences and the like but also a wide range of ancillary matters such as the supply of relevant goods and services in the taxi and broader small commercial passenger vehicles industry.

This breadth facilitates the investigation of provision of electronic and other payment systems for the payment of fares and charges, suppliers of booking and dispatch systems, driver protection screens, taxi fit outs, taxi meters and sealers, security cameras, panel beating, vehicle repairs and maintenance, finance and banking services, licence and insurance broking, bureau services, call number services, taxi ranks, and vehicle consumables such as fuel, oil and tyres.  These matters are thought to be important in the current monopolistic and coercive practices evident at present in the Victorian taxi industry (see Taxi Industry Inquiry).

In its second phase, the Commission is positioned as the Victorian Government's regulator of taxi services and other small commercial passenger vehicles.  This role will require the TSC to, among other things, administer any licensing and accreditation schemes and conduct compliance and enforcement and other activities.

Governance

Constitution 
The Commission consists of a Chairperson and up to two Commissioners.  Professor Allan Fels has been appointed as Chairperson and Dr David Cousins AM as a Commissioner.  Provision is also made for staff to be engaged by the Commission to assist it in its work.  The Commissioners in the Commission's initial inquiry phase are not automatically transitioned to manage the Commission when it assumes its role as a regulator as fresh appointments are required.

Transport Integration Act 

The Transport Legislation Amendment (Taxi Services Reform and Other Matters) Act amended the Transport Integration Act to provide the TSC with a governance framework - the objects, functions and powers  - which comprise the charter of the agency.

Object 
The Transport Integration Act provides that the object of the Commission in its inquiry phase is to

"(a) pursue and promote major and enduring improvements in ... —
(i) the provision and accessibility of services in the commercial passenger vehicle industry;
(ii) competition in the commercial passenger vehicle industry;
(iii) innovation in the commercial passenger vehicle industry, including in the business structures, service delivery models, policies and procedures in the industry;
(iv) the safety of passengers and drivers of commercial passenger vehicles;
(b) promote public confidence in the safety of the commercial passenger vehicle industry."

Functions 

The function of the TSC includes -

"(a) conducting an inquiry into—
(i) the structure, conduct, performance and regulation of the commercial passenger vehicle industry; and
(ii) ancillary matters related to the provision of commercial passenger vehicle services; and
(b) reporting on the outcome of the inquiry, including making recommendations about how the commercial passenger vehicle industry should be structured and regulated."

Desirable considerations 
In performing its function, the Commission is required to consider the desirability of -

 raising the standard of customer service in the commercial passenger vehicle industry
 integrating the commercial passenger vehicle industry with other forms of public transport
 improving efficiency in the commercial passenger vehicle industry
 providing education and training to drivers of commercial passenger vehicles
 ensuring that the commercial passenger vehicle industry is regulated under a performance-based regulatory framework
 improving the financial viability of the commercial passenger vehicle industry
 alternative regulatory frameworks and the potential costs (including externalities) and benefits of those frameworks
 any regulatory framework that is recommended being consistent with relevant health, safety, environmental and social requirements
 applying to the commercial passenger vehicle industry
 achieving consistency in the regulation of the commercial passenger vehicle industry between States and on a national basis
 reducing obstacles that prevent people from using commercial passenger vehicle services
 improving the quality of commercial passenger vehicle services at State borders
 promoting environmentally sustainable practices in the commercial passenger vehicle industry.

Inquiry and reporting

Provisions triggering inquiry 
It is not sufficient for the Commission merely to be established for it to conduct an inquiry.  It must also have matters formally referred to it by the Minister for Public Transport before it can commence its inquiry duties.  Accordingly, the Act amended the Transport (Compliance and Miscellaneous) Act to make provision for the Minister to issue a notice specifying the matters to be investigated, the nature of the Commission's reporting on its investigations and other relevant matters.

Conduct of inquiry

General 
The TSC is generally able to conduct its inquiry in the manner it considers appropriate.  A number of requirements and signals are included in the legislation, however, requiring initial and ongoing consultations  The Commission's procedures are informal - it is not bound by the rules of evidence and may inform itself as it considers appropriate.  In addition, the Commission is empowered to conduct hearings in public or in private and may determine whether a person can appear at a hearing and be represented by another person.

Requiring information and documents 
The Act allows the Commission to require a person to provide information or a document to the Commission if the Commission believes on reasonable grounds that -
 the information or document is relevant to the inquiry
 the person has the information or document.

The Commission may also require the person to appear before it to provide the information or the document.

It is an offence to not comply with these requirements.  A person must also not provide false or misleading information or to interfere with another person's actions in pursuance of the requirements.

The privileges against self incrimination and client legal privilege apply in relation to requirements to provide information or documents.

Confidential or commercially sensitive information 
The Act establishes an elaborate scheme relating to the Commission's handling of confidential or commercially sensitive information.  Restrictions apply on the Commission's disclosure or use of sensitive information.  Similarly, freedom of information exempt information is also subject to a number of specific requirements and procedures.

Reporting 
The Act make provision for the Commission to issue three types of reports:  interim reports, special reports and a final report.  The provision must divide reports and if the report contains sensitive information and information from FOI exempt documents, the report is required to be appropriately divided.

The Commission's final report must be laid before Parliament and be made publicly available.  The Act also requires the Minister to cause a review of the taxi and small commercial passenger vehicle regulation provisions of the Transport (Compliance and Miscellaneous) Act 1983 once the final report has been released and recommendations are available.  The review must be completed within 12 months of the report being laid before Parliament.

Independence 
The TSC is independent of Ministers and Government generally in its initial inquiry phase.  No provision is included for the Commission to be directed during this period.  This changes during the second phase when the Commission is subject to the standard powers of direction available to Ministers.

Transfer of taxi regulatory responsibility to the Department of Transport 
The Act transferred regulatory responsibility for taxi regulation from the Director of Public Transport to the Secretary of the Department of Transport.  This step occurred as an interim measure prior to the eventual transfer of the function to the Taxi Services Commission on completion of the current Taxi Industry Inquiry.  In the interim, the function is exercised by the Victorian Taxi Directorate on delegation from the Secretary.

Post-Inquiry Amendments 
Part 3 of the Act will make a number of changes following the completion of the current Taxi Industry Inquiry.  For example, the Taxi Services Commission is conferred with a new object and functions in preparation for its commencement as the regulator of taxi and other small commercial passenger vehicles in Victoria.

Object 
The primary second phase object of the Commission provides that the agency should concentrate on regulating the relevant industries consistent with the vision statement and transport system objectives set out in the Transport Integration Act 2010.  A number of specific matters which are taken to form part of the primary object are then listed comprising -

"(a) to pursue and promote major and enduring improvements in the provision of services in the commercial passenger vehicle industry
(b) to regulate the commercial passenger vehicle industry in a way that—
(i) facilitates competition and innovation in the industry
(ii) increases the use of public transport and minimises the adverse environmental impacts of the commercial passenger vehicle industry
(iii) contributes to social wellbeing by providing access to opportunities and supporting liveable communities
(iv) promotes economic prosperity through the efficient and reliable movement of persons
(v) in collaboration with the following entities, improves the safety of drivers and passengers of commercial passenger vehicles—
(A) the Secretary
(B) the Secretary to the Department of Justice
(C) the Chief Commissioner of Police
(D) the Roads Corporation
(E) the Director of Public Transport
(F) municipal councils
(c) to promote public confidence in the safety of the commercial passenger vehicle industry."

Functions 
The Taxi Services Commission is conferred with a range of new functions by the Act when the Commission undertakes its second phase.  The Act provides that the functions of the Commission are to -

"(a) to develop and implement policies, strategies and performance measures—
(i) to improve the safety and security of the commercial passenger vehicle industry;
(ii) to promote competition and innovation in the commercial passenger vehicle industry;
(iii) to minimise any adverse environmental effects from the commercial passenger vehicle industry;
(iv) for the operation of commercial passenger vehicles;
(b) to provide licensing and accreditation services for the commercial passenger vehicle industry and related matters;
(c) to assist with monitoring and reporting to the Minister on whether the commercial passenger vehicle industry meets Government, contractual and community expectations and performance measures;
(d) to provide, or arrange for the provision and dissemination of, information to Victorians about the commercial passenger vehicle industry;
(e) to advise the Secretary in order to assist the Secretary in developing strategic policy and legislation in relation to the commercial passenger vehicle industry;
(f) to perform any other functions or duties conferred or imposed on the Commission by or under this Act or any other Act."
 
The changes specifically provide that the functions of the Commission do not include a function to develop strategic policy and legislation.  These functions are instead reserved for the Department of Transport to avoid the conflicts of interest involved in regulators performing both policy and legislative tasks.

Other provisions of interest 
The new Act makes specific provision for the Taxi Services Commission to be subject to general or specific direction by the Minister.  A range of other substantive and procedural changes are made by the Act to position the Commission as the regulator of the taxi and small commercial passenger vehicle sector.

Commencement of the TSC as taxi regulator 
As indicated, legislation has been passed by the Victorian Parliament which establishes the Taxi Services Commission as the regulator of the taxi industry and other small commercial passenger vehicles. However, the Victorian Government has indicated that as designed these requirements will not come into operation until after the conclusion of the current Taxi Industry Inquiry.  The legislation itself provides that unless triggered by proclamation to commence earlier, these changes will operate automatically on 1 July 2013.

Parliamentary approval

Introduction 
The Act was introduced into the lower house of the Victorian Parliament, the Legislative Assembly, on 31 May as the Transport Legislation Amendment (Taxi Services Reform and Other Matters) Bill 2011.

The responsible Minister for the Bill was the Minister for Public Transport, the Hon Terry Mulder MP.  The Minister moved the second reading of the proposal on 2 June 2011 and set the context for the Bill in his speech as follows -

"This Bill sets a course for major reform of Victoria's taxi services.

The Bill establishes a new Taxi Services Commission as the first phase of a complex and challenging reform process.  The commission will provide the legislative basis and the powers for the comprehensive inquiry into the taxi industry that is being conducted by Professor Allan Fels, AO.

The inquiry and its broad terms of reference were announced by the Premier in March and its work is already under way. Once the inquiry has been completed, the Commission will take over as the independent regulator of commercial passenger vehicles including taxi and hire cars.

Major reform of the Victorian taxi industry and its regulatory framework is desperately needed to arrest the serious ongoing decline in the standard of taxi services.

In the late 1990s under the Kennett government, Victoria's taxi services compared favourably with other jurisdictions. Now, however, a once-proud taxi industry is on a downward spiral after a decade of government inaction and regulatory failure.

Victorians are fed up with the never-ending problems in the taxi industry and the appalling reduction in levels of service over recent years.  This has been highlighted by the latest report of the Department of Transport's customer satisfaction monitor, which saw overall satisfaction with taxi services fall to the lowest level since the surveys began six years ago. While many taxi operators and drivers do a good job, the problems driving customer dissatisfaction are clear: the long queues for a taxi in the Melbourne CBD and other entertainment districts on a Friday or Saturday night, drivers who do not know where to go, taxis that do not turn up, drivers who will not accept a short fare, violent incidents and unsafe behaviour.

Victorians are embarrassed when a dirty taxi or a poorly trained driver gives international visitors an unfavourable first impression of Melbourne. They are angry when they hear that taxi licences cost up to half a million dollars while taxidrivers are earning less than the minimum wage.

The Victorian public supports the need for an inquiry and will be raising many issues that have been hindering the industry's performance."

The Minister then spoke about the role of taxis in the overall transport mix and also commented on the Victorian public's expectations of taxi services -

"Taxis have a unique and crucial role in the transport system.  They are a vital link in the public transport network, providing a flexible, point-to-point mode of transport that fills the gaps in fixed-route train, tram and bus services. In particular, taxis are the only mode of transport available to a range of groups which cannot drive a motor vehicle and cannot access other public transport services due to factors such as age, disability or where they live.

Victorians simply want to be able to get a taxi when they need one. They want the driver to know the way to their destination. They ask that the cab be clean and safe.

These are the basics of a good taxi service and that is what the Taxi Services Commission is being established to achieve. Victorians have had enough of governments fiddling around the edges, avoiding the real issues, endlessly talking about the problems and never fixing them."

The Minister then commented on the specific measures effected by the Bill -

"The Commission will be an independent statutory agency, structurally separate from the Department of Transport. The Bill establishes the commission as a body corporate in part 5 of the Transport Integration Act 2010 along with the other central transport bodies critical to our transport system.

The Bill has four parts. Part 1 provides for preliminary matters such as the purpose and commencement provisions. Part 4 of the bill provides for the repeal of the amending act. Parts 2 and 3 of the Bill set out the two major stages for the Commission.

In its first stage, the Commission will conduct the comprehensive inquiry. It is anticipated that the Commission will provide a final report to government by mid-2012. During this stage, the Commission will have the mandate to promote major and enduring change to the taxi and hire car industry.

The inquiry will cover the commercial passenger vehicle industry in its entirety. While taxis will be the focus of the inquiry, this broad scope means that the Commission is able to inquire into hire cars, restricted hire cars, special-purpose vehicles and public commercial passenger vehicles (including certain buses).

The Commission will be able inquire into the holders of commercial passenger vehicle licences, the operators of commercial passenger vehicles, providers of taxi network services, and ancillary matters such as the supply of relevant goods and services in the industry. This industry-wide approach will ensure that the Commission can comprehensively address systemic failures in the conduct, performance and regulation of the industry.

In its second stage, the Commission will assume the role of the industry regulator and take responsibility for implementing the reforms decided by the government as a result of the inquiry."

The Minister concluded his speech in support of the Bill by stating that -

"(T)his Bill reflects the government's determination to ensure that Victoria once again has world-class taxi services."

Passage, assent and commencement 

The Transport Legislation Amendment (Taxi Services Reform and Other Amendments) Bill was passed by the Legislative Assembly on 16 June 2011.  The Bill was introduced into the Legislative Council on the same day.  Second reading was moved immediately.  The Bill was ultimately passed without amendment on 30 June 2011.

The Bill received the Royal Assent on 5 July 2011 to become the Transport Legislation Amendment (Taxi Services Reform and Other Amendments) Act 2011.  The Act was partially proclaimed to commence on 19 July 2011.

Changes to the Act 
No significant changes have been made to the Act since it was passed.

See also 

 Taxi Industry Inquiry
 Taxi Services Commission
 Transport Integration Act
 Transport (Compliance and Miscellaneous) Act 1983
 Buses in Melbourne
 Safety

References

External links 
 Department of Transport website
 Government of Victoria website

Transport in Melbourne
Public transport in Melbourne
Victoria (Australia) legislation
Transport Legislation Amendment (Taxi Services Reform and Other Matters) Act 2011
Taxis
2011 in Australian law
2010s in Victoria (Australia)
History of transport in Victoria (Australia)
2011 in transport
Transport legislation